Telephone numbers in Syria, lists the telephone numbering and dialing conventions in Syria.

Dialing conventions
 For dialing a number from a land line to the land line in the same area (city), only the local number of destination is needed.
 For dialing a number from a land line to the land line in another area (city), a zero followed by area code of destination and the local number of destination is needed.
 For dialing a number from a land line to a mobile number, a zero followed by mobile provider 2 digit code and the destination number is needed.
 For dialing a number from a mobile phone to a land line number, a zero followed by area code of destination and the local number of destination is needed.
 For dialing a number from a mobile phone to another mobile phone, a zero followed by mobile provider 2 digit code and the destination number is needed.

Mobile phones
There are 2 mobile phone operators in Syria:
 Syriatel: 93, 98, 99.
 MTN Syria: 94, 95, 96.
 Landline: 11.

See also
Communications in Syria
Syrian Telecom 092

References

ITU allocation list

Syria
Telecommunications in Syria
Telephone numbers